Zgornje Selce (in older sources also Zgornje Sevce) is a settlement in the Municipality of Šentjur in eastern Slovenia. It lies between Ponikva and Grobelno. The railway line from Celje to Maribor runs along the western edge of the settlement's territory. The settlement, and the entire municipality, are included in the Savinja Statistical Region, which is in the Slovenian portion of the historical Duchy of Styria.

References

External links
Zgornje Selce at Geopedia

Populated places in the Municipality of Šentjur